Garhi Dupatta (also spelled Garhi Dopatta) is a small town.

References

External links

Populated places in Muzaffarabad District